Orlando Health Arnold Palmer Hospital for Children is a 158-bed pediatric hospital in Orlando, Florida, United States.  Arnold Palmer Hospital is part of Orlando Health, and is supported by the Arnold Palmer Medical Center Foundation. Together, the Arnold Palmer Hospital for Children and the Winnie Palmer Hospital for Women & Babies form the Arnold Palmer Medical Center. Arnold Palmer Hospital for Children is also home to the Howard Phillips Center for Children & Families.

The Bert Martin's Champions for Children Emergency Department & Trauma Center at Arnold Palmer Hospital is part of the only Level One Trauma Center in the area

As of the 2016-2017 rankings, Arnold Palmer Hospital is nationally ranked as a “Best Children’s Hospital” by U.S. News & World Report in five pediatric specialties - cardiology & heart surgery, diabetes & endocrinology, gastroenterology & GI surgery, orthopedics and urology.

Arnold Palmer Hospital for Children has affiliations with Camp Boggy Creek, Children's Miracle Network, the Florida Association of Children's Hospitals, Give Kids the World, the Make-A-Wish Foundation, the National Association of Children's Hospitals and Related Institutions, and the Ronald McDonald House.

References

Notes

External links
 

Hospital buildings completed in 1989
Buildings and structures in Orlando, Florida
Hospitals in Florida
Arnold Palmer
Healthcare in Orlando, Florida
Children's hospitals in the United States
Pediatric trauma centers